Theodore Glen Stroup, Jr. (born March 11, 1940) is a retired United States Army Lieutenant General (LTG) who served as Deputy Chief of Staff G-1 Personnel of The United States Army from 1994 to 1996.

LTG Stroup was commissioned through the United States Military Academy in 1962. He earned a master's degree in civil engineering from Texas A&M University in 1965 and is a registered professional engineer in Texas and Pennsylvania. Stroup later received an M.B.A. degree from The American University and graduated from the Army War College.

References

1940 births
Living people
People from St. Petersburg, Florida
United States Military Academy alumni
Texas A&M University alumni
American civil engineers
United States Army personnel of the Vietnam War
Kogod School of Business alumni
Recipients of the Meritorious Service Medal (United States)
Recipients of the Legion of Merit
United States Army generals